Yengabad-e Kuh (also Romanized as Yengābād-e Kūh; also known as Nīgābād-e Kūh) is a village in Kolah Boz-e Sharqi Rural District, in the Central District of Meyaneh County, East Azerbaijan Province, Iran. At the 2006 census, its population was 223, in 54 families.

References 

Populated places in Meyaneh County